The National Trust of Guernsey is an association that preserves and enhances historic buildings and the heritage of the Bailiwick of Guernsey.  Founded in 1960, the association became The National Trust of Guernsey in 1967.

In 1968, the Trust, as part of a joint venture with La Societe Guernesiaise, established the Guernsey Folk Museum in Saumarez Park.  The site had previously been home to a display of an old Guernsey kitchen setup as part of the 1951 Festival of Britain. The museum has expanded to become the Folk & Costume Museum, which is now overseen by the Trust.  The museum describes the everyday lives of the people of Guernsey over the last 250 years through a selection of objects and costumes.

The  Trust headquarters  is at 26 Cornet Street, which may be the earliest remaining complete building within Saint Peter Port's medieval boundaries. Since 1987, the property has housed a Victorian shop and parlour that offers  traditional sweets and gifts.

Since 2009 the Trust has opened up an old Guernsey farmhouse at Les Caches Farm that was restored to the 1800s era. The building now houses information detailing the restoration process and an event space for public and private functions.

The Trust holds large number of properties across Guernsey, ranging from traditional buildings to areas of natural beauty along the island's south coast cliffs.  The National Trust of Guernsey currently has over 2,000 members.

External links
National Trust of Guernsey

Guernsey culture
Guernsey
Organisations based in Guernsey
Tourism in Guernsey
1960 establishments in Guernsey
Organizations established in 1960
Historic sites in Guernsey